Cape George may refer to:
 Cape George, Antigonish County, Nova Scotia
 Cape George, Richmond County, Nova Scotia
 Cape George, Washington
 Cape George (South Georgia)